Elora is a community in the township of Centre Wellington, Wellington County, Ontario, Canada. It is well known for its 19th-century limestone architecture and the geographically significant Elora Gorge.

Elora is no longer an independent entity. In 1999, the Township of Centre Wellington was formed by amalgamating the Town of Fergus; the Village of Elora; and the Townships of Nichol, Pilkington, West Garafraxa, and part of Eramosa. In 2011, the community referred to as Elora had a population of approximately 7,756.

History
Roman Catholic missionaries first visited the area in the early to mid 1600s, attempting to Christianize the indigenous people, particularly the Neutral Nation on the Attiwandaronk Lands. The first European settlers arrived in 1817,  and Roswell Matthews built a home here the next year.

Captain William Gilkison (1777–1833) was born in Ayrshire, Scotland, and emigrated to North America in 1796. He served with the British forces in the War of 1812 as an assistant quartermaster-general, and in 1832 purchased some 14,000 acres of land in Nichol Township. He selected this area near the falls of the Grand River as a town site for his proposed settlement and named it Elora. It was laid out by Lewis Burwell, deputy provincial land surveyor, late in 1832, and the following year Gilkison established a sawmill and a general store. The founder of Elora died in April, 1833, before the full results of his foresight and enterprise were achieved.

Elora was founded in 1832 by Captain William Gilkison, originally from Scotland, who was a British officer recently returned from India. He had also served in the War of 1812, fighting the nascent United States. He bought 14,000 acres of land on the Grand River and settled on the east side of the river. The plan for the settlement was laid out by Lewis Burwell, in late 1832, when it was called Irvine Settlement. By 1833, Gilkison had opened a sawmill and a general store. Gilkison named the community after his brother's ship, which was itself inspired by the Ellora Caves near Aurangabad, Maharashtra, India.

Charles Allan and Andrew Geddes laid out a town site on the west side of the river. By 1848, village lots were being sold and the settlement was incorporated into a village in 1858. The commercial area was near the grist mill, by the waterfalls (Mill St.) and eventually moved further up the hill.

The Smith's Canadian Gazetteer of 1846 describes Elora as having a beautiful waterfalls and a deep channel carved by the river in the limestone rock. At the time there were only 100 inhabitants but two churches, three mills and a post office. Otherwise there were a few tradesmen and a single tavern.

In the 1850s and 1860s, Elora was a major agricultural marketplace. Stores in the downtown area sold many types of goods. The flour mill and saw mill were powered by the Grand River. In 1869 the population was 1,500. By 1870, several other mills, two distilleries, a carpet factory, tannery and two furniture factories were operating. While there were some earlier private providers of electricity on a small scale, more extensive provision of power, by Ontario Hydropower, began in 1914.

Elora Mill 
The extant five-storey Elora grist mill was built in 1832, and through its history housed a sawmill, distillery and flour mill. In the 1970s, it became a hotel called the Elora Mill Inn, which closed in 2010. Plans were submitted to convert the building to condominiums and a hotel,  and in 2017 a report stated "Elora Mill Inn and Spa, a $120 million project expected to bring a world class resort and 250 jobs to the area when it opens in Spring 2018. Following a $27 million renovation, the Elora Mill Hotel and Spa, owned by Pearle Hospitality, opened in July 2018, employing 170 people and featuring 30 rooms and a restaurant. Construction of the condominium section of the property was to begin in 2019.

In February 2020, the property was awarded a Heritage Recognition Award by Heritage Centre Wellington.

David Street (Irvine Creek) bridge 

In 2002 the Township of Centre Wellington announced that, for safety reasons, it would be necessary to demolish the historically important David Street Bridge over Irvine Creek. The structure and its pier had been built in 1868 by Charles Lawrence, a stonemason. The structure was "the first cantilever bridge in North America". (A more modest earlier bridge had been built over the Irvine Creek in 1848.) It is described as one of the few remaining open-spandrel concrete arch bridges and is listed in the Ontario Heritage Bridge Program. Concerned about the preservation of Elora's culturally significant architecture, the group Elora Heritage was founded. They received over 1,000 names on a petition. They met with representatives from town council as well as the provincial and federal governments.

It became apparent that the bridge was beyond preservation; however council agreed to preserve the pier and build a replica bridge in 2004. The project presented numerous engineering challenges but was successfully completed. The current structure is similar to the 1921 bridge; the 1867 stone pier was retained as had been planned.

Victoria Street Bridge

Most parts of another bridge over the river, known as the Victoria Street Pedestrian Bridge, had been demolished years ago but it was being rebuilt in 2019 as part of the downtown re-development.

The first Victoria Street Bridge over the Grand River was built in 1843, again in 1871 and lastly the as a Pratt struss bridge in 1899. The latest structure, a non truss concrete beam pedestrian bridge with decorative railings and stone cladding mimicking arch below, replaced the previous structure which was demolished in 2006. Named for Jack R. MacDonald, the new bridge opened in November 2019 and allows for increased pedestrian access into the core.

Metcalfe Badley Bridge

The Metcalfe Street (Badley) Bridge (c. 1952-1953) is the main vehicular bridge with direct access into town. The Parker Through truss bridge has been assessed as in poor state and would be closed for repairs or replacement. The new bridge will not be a truss bridge in order to accommodate vehicles, cyclists and pedestrians. The scope of the Victoria St. project was described as:Construction of the bridge deck concrete topping and side curbs, masonry pilasters, steel framing and arched masonry stone side skirts along the bridge, steel railings, electrical, lighting and the finished piazza concrete slab, retaining wall, storm sewer extension and planting beds.

A report in April 2020 indicated that benefits included "wider traffic lanes and sidewalks, two new bike lanes, an expanded observation deck, enhanced lighting, limestone gateway piers". The reconstructed bridge opened on 18 December 2020.

From "poorhouse" to museum 
In 1877, the County opened the Wellington County House of Industry and Refuge, or Poorhouse as it was called, on Wellington Road 18 between Fergus and Elora. Over the years, approximately 1500 "deserving" poor, including those who were destitute, old and infirm or suffering from disabilities were housed here. The sixty bed house for "inmates" was surrounded by a 30-acre "industrial" farm with a barn for livestock that produced some of the food for the 70 residents and the staff and also provided work for them. Others worked in the House itself. According to a 2009 report by the Toronto Star, "pauperism was considered a moral failing that could be erased through order and hard work". A hospital was added in 1892. A nearby cemetery has 271 plots for those who died. In 1947 the House was converted into the Wellington County Home for the Aged and in 1975 the building reopened as the Wellington County Museum and Archives.

A historic plaque was erected at the museum, indicating that the "government-supported poorhouse" was "the shelter of last resort for the homeless and destitute, who traded spartan accommodations for domestic or agricultural labour".

Raceway and slots controversy

In 2000 a proposal was made to bring a standardbred horse racing track with slot machines to Elora, by creating the Grand River Raceway. The plan became the subject of much debate. The Centre Wellington Citizens Coalition was formed in opposition to the race track, primarily because of the inclusion of gambling facilities. A 4–3 decision to approve the opening was made by township council. It came down to a 3–3 decision and the mayor at the time voted in favour of it. The Grand River Raceway eventually opened in Elora in 2002, with Slots At Grand River Raceway offering 200 slot machines operated by the Ontario Lottery and Gaming Corporation (OLG).

Grand River Raceway is owned and operated by the Grand River Agricultural Society (G.R.A.S.), a not-for-profit corporation, incorporated under the Agricultural Societies Act of Ontario and operated by a volunteer board of directors. The Society operates the racetrack and other facilities. It leases space to the OLG for the slot machines; the OLG is the operator and employer for the slots operation. In 2009, the business paid $1.6 million in taxes and the OLG paid the Township an additional $1.78 million, being a share of the profits.

A plan for substantial expansion, approved by Township Council in February 2017, will include gaming tables (up to 52) and many additional slot machines (up to 1,200 in total). Some councillors were strongly opposed to the plan. The rationale for the majority decision was the revenue benefit; since the slots opened, the Township has received over $22 million from the currently small operation.

Tourism

Many tourists visit Elora on day trips, attracted by the historic nature of the town or the Grand River Raceway with horse racing and slot machines. It has many small shops, pubs, cafés, restaurants and art galleries. These are often in buildings built during the mid 19th century. The Gorge Cinema is Canada's oldest continuously running repertory theatre.  The annual Elora Festival & Singers event is particularly popular.

The Elora Gorge and its Conservation Area are at the edge of town. The park offers canoeing, paddleboat rentals, hiking, camp-grounds, fishing and picnicking.  Some of the limestone cliffs are 12 metres (40 feet) high. At the eastern end of the village is the Elora Quarry Conservation Area, a scenic former limestone quarry, and is now a popular swimming area.

In 2001, a group of citizens organized an arts and cultural centre, the Elora Centre for the Arts, at the site of a century school whose headmaster had been at one time David Boyle, who was well known as an educator in the late 1800s.

The township of Centre Wellington has an active historical society and operates the Wellington County Museum and Archives in a historic stone building in Aboyne, halfway between Elora and Fergus, Ontario. This two-storey Italianate-style stone building was the oldest known state-supported poorhouse or almshouse in Canada, called the House of Industry and Refuge when it opened in 1877. The museum opened in 1975 and the building was designated a National Historic Site of Canada in 1995.

Climate
Elora has a humid continental climate (Dfb) under the Köppen climate classification with cold winters and warm summers.

Geography

Demographics
The Canada 2001 Census was the last Canadian census to record Elora as a separate community. In the Canada 2006 Census, demographic statistics were published only for Centre Wellington.

According to the Canada 2001 Census:

Data extrapolated from the 2011 Canada Census report indicates that at the time, Elora had a population of about 7,756.

No data for this community was available in the 2016 census, but the population of the entire Centre Wellington Township was 28,191, and this included the population of Fergus which was 20,767 at that time.

Local government
The Centre Wellington Township council includes a Mayor (Kelly Linton) and six councillors. Three of the latter live in Fergus while one lives in Elora.
The Township is also represented on the County of Wellington Council which is made up of seven mayors and nine councillors. Kelly Linton was elected Warden, the head of this council, in December 2018.

Economy
Centre Wellington is heavily agricultural but is also the home to industries, manufacturers, retailers, health care services and trades people. The local economy also benefits greatly from tourism. Data is not available for Elora alone but at the time of the 2011 Census, 6.4% of the workforce of Centre Wellington was involved in agriculture and other resource-based industries/utilities, 24.8% in manufacturing and construction, 19.8% in health and education and 13.2% in wholesale and retail trade. The top three categories for employment (in order of importance) were in manufacturing, Healthcare and Agriculture. The major employers in the township include Jefferson Elora Corp., Nexans Canada, Polycorp Ltd., Groves Memorial Hospital, Wellington Terrace and PR Donnelly.

Centre Wellington encourages the filming of movies and TV shows; quite a few productions have taken advantage of the historic look of Fergus, and especially Elora, for location work. In 2016, parts of the 10-part miniseries, Canada: The Story of Us, were filmed in Elora which was a stand-in for scenes of WW II skirmishes in Holland and France.

The Elora Quarry was used to film a couple of scenes in the movie Angel Eyes, and for a scene for the 2017 movie It. The Elora Quarry and nearby West Montrose Covered Bridge were also featured in It.  Parts of the Grand River in both Elora and Fergus were the site for some of the scenes filmed for the 1994 movie Trapped in Paradise.  Other productions have also done filming in Elora, including the 1979 TV movie, An American Christmas Carol,According to Centre Wellington, Elora or Fergus was also featured in: Lars and the Real Girl (2007), Dead Silence (2007) and Mrs. Soffel (1984).

Sports
Elora has a very active lawn bowling club that offers programs for all ages. The Elora Rocks Lawn Bowling Club is a member of District 7 of the Ontario Lawn Bowling Association, and more information about the club may be found on the District website.

Elora is also home to the Elora Mohawks lacrosse team, the Elora Rocks hockey team.

At the community level, Elora also has a skating club, a curling club, a girls' hockey team (Grand River Mustangs), minor hockey team (Centre Wellington Fusion), soccer (Fergus-Elora District Soccer), a ringette team, and a few baseball teams, as well as several other sports clubs and organizations.

Notable people

 Sitara Hewitt, actress (Little Mosque on the Prairie)
Charles Kirk Clarke (1857–1924), psychiatrist, Dean, Faculty of Medicine, University of Toronto; Clarke Institute of Psychiatry named in his honour
George A. Drew, Premier of Ontario
Fred Jacob (journalist) who worked for Toronto's The Mail and Empire (now The Globe and Mail), Jacob also wrote two novels, featuring fictional towns resembling Elora
Myrtle Cook (1902–1985), track athlete
Dane Dobbie, professional lacrosse player

See also

 List of unincorporated communities in Ontario

References

Bibliography
Carter, Floreen Ellen, Place Names of Ontario,  London, Ontario, Phelps Publishing, 1984,

External links
 Township of Centre Wellington

Former villages in Ontario
Populated places established in 1832
Communities in Centre Wellington
Populated places on the Grand River (Ontario)
1832 establishments in Canada
Populated places disestablished in 1999